Alan Baraghush Rural District is in Mehraban District of Sarab County, East Azerbaijan province, Iran. At the National Census of 2006, its population was 6,072 in 1,407 households. There were 5,666 inhabitants in 1,460 households at the following census of 2011. At the most recent census of 2016, the population of the rural district was 4,504 in 1,284 households. The largest of its 20 villages was Alan, with 1,759 people.

References 

Sarab County

Rural Districts of East Azerbaijan Province

Populated places in East Azerbaijan Province

Populated places in Sarab County